Karthik Naralasetty was born in Guntur. His father was a Physical Director of Hindu College, Guntur. is an internet entrepreneur and founder of social networking site socialblood. He was born in Andhra Pradesh, India.

Career
Karthik dropped out of Rutgers University, New Jersey in 2009 to found his own technology company called redcode Informatics in Bangalore, India. In November 2011 he was one of the Staples Youth Social Entrepreneur Award winners, for his work at socialblood.org.

In February 2015 Forbes India recognized him as one of the 30 under 30 innovators.

References

External links

Living people
Telugu people
Date of birth missing (living people)
1989 births
Businesspeople from Andhra Pradesh
Indian Internet company founders